Iconi Airport  was an airport located in Moroni, the capital city of the Comoros islands. The airport was on the western side of the island of Grande Comore, north of the town of Iconi.

It was closed a few years ago in favor of the new Prince Said Ibrahim International Airport.

Facilities

The Iconi non-directional beacon (Ident: FXM) is located just north of the field.

See also

Transport in Comoros
List of airports in Comoros

References

External links
OpenStreetMap - Iconi Airport
SkyVector - Moroni Iconi Airport

Defunct airports
Airports in the Comoros
Buildings and structures in Moroni, Comoros